Rangpur Riders Cricket  Arena is a cricket stadium  in the Bashundhara Sports Complex, which is the home venue of Rangpur Riders. Bashundhara Sports Complex is located in Dhaka, Bangladesh which is considered as one of the largest sports complex in Bangladesh. It has been designed by Architect Mohammad Foyez Ullah of Volumezero Limited. The stadium was opened to the public on 4 January 2023. It has a seating capacity of 18,000.

History
The Rangpur Riders have played a practice game against Khulna Tigers on 4 January 2023 at its home venue. Rangpur Riders is the first cricket club in Bangladesh whom have home venue in Bangladesh Premier League (T20). The club hint that they will be host their home matches at their own ground in future.

References

Cricket grounds in Bangladesh
Sports venues in Dhaka
Cricket in Dhaka